Hard Kill is a 2020 American action thriller film directed by Matt Eskandari, starring Jesse Metcalfe, Bruce Willis, and Natalie Eva Marie. It was released on August 21, 2020, by Vertical Entertainment.

Plot
Upset that her revolutionary technology will be misused for military purposes, Eva Chalmers approaches an extremist known as the Pardoner, who promises to help her use it to save the world.  When she balks at his terrorist plans, he takes her hostage and attempts to coerce her father, Donovan, into revealing the code to activate it.  Donovan hires a team of mercenaries led by Derek Miller to rescue Eva and recover the tech.

Cast
 Jesse Metcalfe as Derek Miller
 Bruce Willis as Donovan Chalmers
 Natalie Eva Marie as Sasha
 Lala Kent as Eva Chalmers
 Texas Battle as Nicholas Fox
 Sergio Rizzuto as The Pardoner
 Swen Temmel as Dash Hawkins
 Tyler Jon Olson as Lt. Colton
 Jacquie Nguyen as Gemma
 Leslee Emmett as Crystal

Production
Principal photography began in January 2020 in Cincinnati, under the working title Open Source. According to the Los Angeles Times and actress Lala Kent, an incident occurred on set when Bruce Willis incidentally fired a gun loaded with blanks on the wrong cue and then did it again on the next take. Nobody was injured but the report said the incident left some crew members "shaken". Hard Kill is one of the last films to star Willis, who retired from acting because he was diagnosed with aphasia.

Release
The film was simultaneously released in theaters and video on-demand in the United States on August 21, 2020. Hard Kill then became available to stream on Netflix in the USA on November 23, 2020 and was the top streamed film for several weeks.

Box office
As of October 29, 2020, Hard Kill grossed $111,523 in the United Arab Emirates, Saudi Arabia, and Vietnam.

Reception

Frank Scheck of The Hollywood Reporter said that Willis "seems to have settled on making listless appearances in forgettable B-movie action movies as a retirement funding plan". He said that although Metcalfe "boasts the appropriate physicality" for his role, he is "unable to summon sufficient charisma to make his character remotely interesting".  Scheck called the other performances "equally lackluster" except for Marie, who "makes for a convincing female badass". Kevin Maher of The Times gave the film 1/5 stars, writing: "I can only hope that Bruce Willis managed to squeeze a house out of the producers of this breathtakingly poor mess about a, ahem, 'quantum' military computer program that can either destroy the world or save it."

Accolades

References

External links
 

2020 films
2020 independent films
American action thriller films
Films directed by Matt Eskandari
Films shot in Ohio
Vertical Entertainment films
2020s English-language films
2020s American films